"Mind" is also a song on System of a Down's eponymous first album.

"Mind" is a single by Liverpool-based baggy group The Farm, released as the first single off their second album Love See No Colour on 12 August 1991 through the band's label Produce Records. It was produced by Graham "Suggs" McPherson of Madness. The single peaked at #31 on the UK Singles Chart.

Track listing

UK CD single
 "Mind" (Original 7" Mix) - 4:30
 "Stepping Stone" (12" Original Mix) - 6:30
 "Mind" (Contorted Face Mix) - 4:39
 "Over Again" (Live Demo) - 4:12

1991 singles
The Farm (British band) songs
Songs written by Peter Hooton
Songs written by Steve Grimes